Dewar is an unincorporated town in eastern Black Hawk County, Iowa, United States.  It lies northeast of the city of Waterloo, the county seat of Black Hawk County.  Its elevation is 889 feet (271 m).  Although Dewar is unincorporated, it has a post office with the ZIP code of 50623, which opened on 25 October 1887.

History
Dewar (formerly known as Emert) was platted in 1888. Dewar's population was 22 in 1902, and 40 in 1925.

References

Unincorporated communities in Black Hawk County, Iowa
Unincorporated communities in Iowa
1888 establishments in Iowa